"The Sword March" is a Chinese patriotic song first sung in the Republic of China during the Second Sino-Japanese War (World War II) after the Japanese invasion of 1937. It is also known in Chinese by its first line, Dàdāo xiàng guǐzi de tóu shàng kǎn qù: "Our dadaos raised o'er the devils' heads! Hack them off!"

History
Mai Xin wrote the song in 1937 specifically to honour the valour of the 29th Army during the Marco Polo Bridge Incident, where their standard weapons were only a rifle and a sword known in Chinese as a dadao. Originally an agricultural tool, the long-hilted Dadao with its powerful chopping blade was a favourite weapon of peasant militias. Guizi—literally, "the hateful one(s)"—was a racial epithet formerly used against the Western powers during the failed Boxer Rebellion; the anthem helped popularise its use in reference to the Japanese, which remains current in modern China.

The lyrics were later changed to broaden its appeal from just the 29th to the "entire nation's" armed forces. This song became the de facto army marching cadence in the Chinese National Revolutionary Army. The Chinese television series known in English as Chop! in fact used the song's opening line as its title. It also appears in the films Lust, Caution and The Children of Huang Shi.

Lyrics

References

External links
1963 music video from the opera Revolutionary History Song Performance

Political party songs
Chinese patriotic songs
Chinese military marches
1937 songs